Buraq is a heavenly hybrid creature in Islamic mythology.

Buraq or Boraq may also refer to:

Places
 Buraq, Iran, a village 
 Borun, Iran, also known as Borāq, a village
 Burraq, Syria
 Al-Buraq, Syria

Other uses
 Buraq Air, a Libyan Airline
 Buraq Hajib, 13th century leader of the Qara Khitay people
 Buraq Express, a passenger train in Pakistan
 Radio Buraq, an FM radio station in Pakistan
 Buraq Wall, another name for the Western Wall in Jerusalem
Al-Buraq Mosque
 Al Boraq, or Casablanca–Tangier high-speed rail line, in Morocco

See also

 Barack (disambiguation)
 Barak (disambiguation)
 Baraq (disambiguation)
 1929 Palestine riots, or the Buraq Uprising
 Boragh, an Iranian armoured personnel carrier
 Bouraq Indonesia Airlines the former company (closed in 2006).
 Burak (name)
 NESCOM Burraq, a Pakistani unmanned combat aerial vehicle